The men's decathlon at the 2012 African Championships in Athletics was held at the Stade Charles de Gaulle on 27 and 28 June.

Medalists

Records

Schedule

Results

100 metres

Long jump

Shot put

High jump

400 metres

110 metres hurdles

Discus throw

Pole vault

Javelin throw

1500 metres

Final standings

References

Results

Decathlon
Combined events at the African Championships in Athletics